Winona Health is a hospital in Winona County, Minnesota, United States.  It is located in the city of Winona and includes a licensed 49-bed acute care hospital.  Other facilities of Winona Health in Winona County include a 110-bed long-term care facility, 60-apartment assisted living community, two 10-room memory care living facilities, hospice, homecare, multi-speciality clinic in Winona, physician clinic in Rushford, Minnesota, orthopedic clinic, inpatient and outpatient mental health services, rehabilitative care (physical & occupational therapy, cardiac rehabilitation), inpatient and outpatient surgery, and dialysis.

Winona Health was founded in 1894 when local citizens and physicians raised $4,500 to remodel the former Langley Home into the 18-bed Winona General Hospital. It is one of the largest employers in Winona.
 key people = Rachelle Schultz, EdD, President & Chief Executive Officer
 number of employees = over 1,000 plus over 350 volunteers

Awards and recognition
Winon Health has received the following recognitions:
One of the Top 100 Rural and Community Hospitals by The Chartis Center for Rural Health in 2017, 2018, 2019, and 2020.

References

External links
Winona Health website

Buildings and structures in Winona, Minnesota
Hospitals in Minnesota
1894 establishments in Minnesota
Hospitals established in 1894